Bathytoma lacertosus is a species of sea snail, a marine gastropod mollusk in the family Borsoniidae.

Description
The length of the shell attains 13 mm, its width 7 mm.

(Original description) The solid shell is biconical. It contains six whorls, of which two compose the protoconch. Its colour is salmon-buff, the ribs cream. A few scattered ferruginous dots and large square ferruginous spots appear in the intercostal spaces. The ribs are low, trabecular, and projecting in an acute angle from the shoulder. There are nine ribs on the body whorl. Sometimes elevated crescentic lamellae extend from these ribs to the suture. Other lamellae continue as fine growth lines across the shell. The spirals are faint threads, evanescent on the shoulder and prominent on the snout. Of these there are about forty on the body whorl, twelve of which are posterior to the angle. The aperture is simple and unfinished in the only example available.

Distribution
This species occurs in the demersal zone of Southwest Pacific Ocean off Queensland and New South Wales, Australia.

References

  Hedley, C. 1922. A revision of the Australian Turridae. Records of the Australian Museum 13(6): 213-359, pls 42-56
 Laseron, C. 1954. Revision of the New South Wales Turridae (Mollusca). Australian Zoological Handbook. Sydney : Royal Zoological Society of New South Wales 1-56, pls 1-12.
 Wells F.E. (1991) A revision of the Recent Australian species of the turrid genera Clavus, Plagiostropha, and Tylotiella (Mollusca: Gastropoda). Journal of the Malacological Society of Australia 12: 1–33. 
 Wilson, B. 1994. Australian Marine Shells. Prosobranch Gastropods. Kallaroo, WA : Odyssey Publishing Vol. 2 370 pp. 
  Bouchet P., Kantor Yu.I., Sysoev A. & Puillandre N. (2011) A new operational classification of the Conoidea. Journal of Molluscan Studies 77: 273-308.

lacertosus
Gastropods of Australia